The Anointed or The Anointed One may refer to:

 The Messiah, the savior and liberator in Abrahamic religions
 The Christ (title), the Messiah in Christianity 
 A person prophesied in Daniel 9:25 who will come (or appear, or be known publicly) after 490 (Sixty-nine Sevens) years from a word (or command) to restore and rebuild Jerusalem
 Isa, or Jesus, in Islamic theology
 The 'anointed', a group of Christians according to the belief of Jehovah's Witnesses
 Anointed One (Buffy the Vampire Slayer), a character from the television series Buffy the Vampire Slayer
 "The Anointed One" (song), a song by Ted Leo and the Pharmacists
 The Anointed, a novel by Clyde Brion Davis
 The Anointed One: An Inside Look At Nevada Politics, a book by about politics in Nevada, US, by Jon Ralston

See also 
 Anointing, a ritual process also known as Unction
 Anointed Quorum